Wyuka Cemetery is the largest cemetery in Lincoln, Nebraska.

In 1890, Lincoln's Bnai Jeshurun Congregation, a Reform congregation, began using a section of Wyuka.

History 
Wyuka Cemetery was established in Lincoln, Nebraska, by an act of the Nebraska Legislature in 1869, which sought to provide a cemetery for the state capital city founded two years prior. The trustees rejected the first cemetery site along Salt Creek to the west of Lincoln due to flooding concerns and instead purchased 80 acres of land east of the city. Wyuka Cemetery has since expanded to over 140 acres between “O” Street and Vine Street.

The iron fence surrounding the cemetery was originally erected around the University of Nebraska-Lincoln City Campus. The Board of Regents authorized the construction of the fence in 1891, and the fence enclosed the original campus until 1925 when it was removed due to safety concerns because fire engines could not pass through the width of the gates.

Wyuka Cemetery was added to the National Register of Historic Places in 1982 and is considered a prime example of the rural cemetery form.

Notable interments

 Hazel Abel (1888–1966), US Senator
 Victor Emanuel Anderson (1902–1962), Governor of Nebraska
 Charles W. Bryan (1867–1945), Mayor of Lincoln and Governor of Nebraska
 Elmer J. Burkett (1867–1935), US Senator
 Amasa Cobb (1823–1905), US Congressman
 Oren Sturman Copeland (1887–1958), US Congressman

 Elizabeth Hawley Everett (1857-1940), clubwoman, suffragist, author, magazine founder/editor, school principal, superindent of schools
 J. James Exon (1921–2005), Governor of Nebraska and US Senator
 Eugene Jerome Hainer (1851–1929), US Congressman

 Don Hollenbeck (1905–1954), Radio newscaster and commentator
 John Larkin (1901–1965), Hollywood screen-writer
 Gilbert L. Laws (1838–1907), US Congressman
 Gordon MacRae (1921–1986), singer and actor
 Turner M. Marquett (1829–1894), US Congressman

 Samuel Roy McKelvie (1881–1956), Governor of Nebraska
 Milton Montgomery (1825–1897), Civil War Brevet Brigadier General
 Albinus Nance (1848–1911), Governor of Nebraska 
 Louise Pound (1872–1958), American folklorist, linguist, and English professor
 William A. Poynter (1848–1909), Governor of Nebraska
 Peter Sauer (1900–1949), Russian-born World Wrestling champion using the ring name Ray Steele

 Charles Starkweather (1938–1959), spree killer
 Jesse Burr Strode (1845–1924), US Congressman
 John Milton Thayer (1820–1906), Governor of Nebraska and US Senator
 Roy Henry Thorpe (1874–1951), US Congressman
 Bobby Rae Williams (1942–2012), professional football player

References

External links
 
 Wyuka Cemetery
 
 

Cemeteries on the National Register of Historic Places in Nebraska
1869 establishments in Nebraska
Buildings and structures in Lincoln, Nebraska
Protected areas of Lancaster County, Nebraska
Jewish cemeteries in Nebraska
History of Lincoln, Nebraska
National Register of Historic Places in Lincoln, Nebraska